Sundari Mohan Das was the founder principal of the Calcutta National Medical College. He was born in Sylhet on 17 December 1857. He took his M.D. degree from Calcutta Medical College. Formerly he was Principle Emeritus of the National Medical Institute and Chittaranjan Hospital, Calcutta; President of the Indian Medical Association, Bengal Branch; Chairman of the Standing Health Committee; Calcutta Corporation; Chairman Nursing and Mandatory Examination Board; Chairman Eden.... committee Nursing Council's Bengal; Chairman Board Of Directors Universal Drug House Pvt. Ltd. A marble statue of Dr. Sundari Mohan Das was unveiled by Dr. Bidhan Chandra Roy, Chief Minister of West Bengal on 15 January 1956 at Calcutta National Medical College

Birth
The paternal home of Late Dr. Sundarimohon Das was in the village of Dighli, in the Sylhet District, now in Bangladesh. He was born in Sylhet on 17 December 1857. It was the time when the first war of Independence against British Rule - the Sepoy Mutiny- was raising its head all through India. He was born on the very day when the mutiny broke out at Latu, a village on the Eastern Border area of the district of Sylhet, then under British occupation.

On getting the news of the mutiny at Latu, many families started on evacuation from Sylhet town by boat and Sundarimohan's mother, who was in her sixth month of pregnancy, was also among the evacuees. Sundarimohan was born on one of such boats before the mature time. The newborn baby was so delicate that he had to be put in a cotton basket and there was great doubt whether the child would survive long.

His father Swarup Chandra Das (also known as Dewan Swarup Chand) had been serving as a Dewan in the Sylhet Collectorate which at that time was under Dacca Commissariat. Later Swarup Chandra was promoted and transferred to Calcutta as Head Dewan of Kalighat. Gabindapur and Sutanuit which were, during that period, under East India Company.

Education
Sundarimohan's school education started in Sylhet. He passed the entrance examination from the Sylhet Government Pilot High School. After passing his examination Sundarimohan came to Calcutta (modern Kolkata) to prosecute his further studies. He passed his F.A. Examination from the Presidency College. He took his M.B. degree from the Calcutta Medical College. He was a good scholar all through his educational career and earned scholarship starting from the lowest school stage up to the stage in the Calcutta medical college.

Student life and public work
While he was a student in the medical college he became a member of the Chaitra Mela, later termed Hindu or National Mela, founded as the Indian Olympic for physical training.

Several friends and their vows
The great orator and National leader Bipin Chandra Pal, poet Ananda Chandra Mitra and Sundarimohan Das, all hailing from Sylhet, were great friends. All four had come under the influence of Sivanath Sastri and became Brahmos. It was again under his influence that these four friends along with others as far back as 1876, took some vows signing their names with their own blood that:
 "Self-rule (Swaraj) is our birth-right and we must not serve under foreigner (i.e. the British)."
 "We shall accumulate no personal wealth and spend all the balance after meeting necessary expenses for the service of the country and the people."
 "We shall not Co-operate with the British administration and the country and the people."
 "We shall marry widows to show that widows have right to marry."
 "We shall not buy or use foreign goods."
All of them remained true to their vows up to the last days of their lives.

Service and social work in Sylhet
After passing his M.B. examination Sundarimohan went to Sylhet as a private practitioner, but he could not be satisfied with this limited sphere of activities. During his short period of stay in Sylhet, he took the lead in establishing a Brahmos samaj there in co-operation with some of the liberal minded citizens of Sylhet town. For his double defiance - his widow marriage and starting of Brahmos samaj – he was driven out his paternal home.

While he was in Sylhet he extensively toured the rural areas of the district. The total lack of female education, the widespread prevalence of all of sorts of superstition among the people and the horrible condition of child delivery then prevailing in society moved him to the core of his heart. With like minded people he started opening a girls' school, and started a campaign against all sorts of corruptions and superstitions and for the improvement of maternity services. It was his experiences gathered mainly in the rural areas of his district that supplied him the materials and provided him with the basis for writing his famous book in easy Bengali, Briddha Dhatri Rojnamcha (Diary of an old midwife).

Service in Calcutta
Coming back to Calcutta, Sundarimohan joined the Calcutta Municipal corporation as a health inspector. At the time of his service under Calcutta corporation, plague broke out in the city and as a preventive measure, he ordered for destroying some stocks of sugar and salt owned by a few British firms. On this issue he came into conflict with the chairman of the corporation, who was British. The chairman asked him to resign and he resigned at once, refusing to compromise with what he felt to be wrong.

It was about the same period that his book Municipal Darpan was written and published. It was written in simple Bengali, in a dialogue form for educating the citizen of Calcutta on matters relating to public health.

Swadeshi Movement (1905)
Sundarimohan had been one of the leaders in the great Swadeshi Movement of Bengali (1905-1910). He had composed a number of inspiring songs on the boycotting of British goods and British education, etc. He led processions on such issues and took an active part in organising "National Education", particularly on technical and medical lines. He was the main organiser of the National Council of Education and one of the founder-members of Bengali Technical Institute (present-day Jadavpur University).

Swadesh industry
The Swadeshi Movement was not just a negative movement to Sundarimohan. He keenly felt that unless the British goods could be replaced by Swadeshi goods through organising Swadeshi industrial production, this movement could not be successful. It was a fond dream of Sundarimohan that India must be made self-sufficient in industrial products. He had imported knitting machineries for the production of hosiery goods at his Sukea Street house where he trained unemployed youths on this line. It was the twenty five thousand (i.e. over Rs.1,25,000/- in today's rupee value) for the project.
As a doctor, he keenly felt the dependence of the country on foreign medicines imported from foreign countries. He set about fighting against this dependence by establishing indigenous pharmaceutical industry in India. He knew the Ayurvedic system of medicine and read Charka and Susruta. His aim was to produce medicines from the various rich herbs available in India in vast quantities, applying modern scientific processes, and also from the modern chemical ingredients. With this purpose in view, he sent his son late Premaananda Das to America in 1908, for studying Pharmaceutical Chemistry. Premananda came back to India after 5 years training and obtaining the degrees M.S. (Master Of Science) and Ph.C. (Pharmaceutical Chemistry) (first in India) from Michigan; also a diploma in Bacteriology and Business Administration from Harvard University acquired practical experiences in big pharmaceutical works in Europe and America.

A political fighter for freedom
Any form of struggle or movement aimed against the British rule and for India's freedom was sacrosanct to him. So we find him among the front rankers of swadeshi movement. The terroristic revolutionary struggle in Bengal also received his unstinted help and support. As a matter of fact his residence in Calcutta was one of the centre for experimenting and making bombs during that period. The great revolutionary Ullaskar dutta would pass a good part of his time in Sundarimohan's house. Another son of Sylhet, Radhakisore Sharma, was actively connected in manufacture bombs in Sundarimohan's residence but he escaped imprisonment by becoming a Vaishnav Babaji at Brindaban. Many terrorist revolutionaries received shelter and protection from the police-hunts in his house and he would contribute good sums for this movement.

It was almost the same period the "extremist" leaders of Calcutta- Aurobindo ghosh, Deshbandu chittaranjan Das Shyamsundar Chakraborty, Mrahmabandha Upadhya, Liakat Hussain and such others- under the leadership of Bipinchandra pal, would regularly meet in his house at 73 Sukea Street hotly discussing the course of movement for achieving "Swaraj" and it was in his course of movement for achieving "Swaraj" and it was in his house that the "Swaraj samity" was first formed This "Swaraj Samity" was the precursor of the well-known "Swarajya Party" of Deshbandhu das.
During Non-Cooperation movement initiative by Mahatma Gandhi we also find him whole-heartedly throwing himself for making the students strike successfully particularly the strike of the Medical Students in Calcutta. His activities in relation to making the Medical Students strike a success, will be discussed later on.

Role in "Swaraj" Corporation
In 1924 when Deshbandhu chittaranjan Das became the first elected mayor of newly formed Calcutta Corporation on being requested by him, Sundarimohan became the Chairman of public health Committee of the corporation. His contributions in Public Health measures may be summarised as follows:-
a) Liberal financial and other aids to non-governmental medical institutions and hospitals. Such ids were formerly almost limited to government hospitals and institutions.
b) Formation of public health associations in every ward with the citizens' representatives, for the first time.
c) Opening of medical centres in different parts the city.
d) Provision for junior nurses training with purposes of widening the scope of nurse training for the poorer sections.
e) Appointment of trained "dhais" for attending the maternity cases, going from house to house and setting up of Maternity Homes in different parts of the city.
f) First inception of co-operatives supply of pure milk at cheaper rates children and hospital patients.

Main sphere of activities
His main sphere of activities gradually veered round in organisation independent medical institutions and hospitals, free from government control, for the service of the common people, though he remained connected with other social and political activities all through his life.

It was under his advice and inspiration that Chittaranjan Seva Sadan came into being and Dr. Sundarimohan Das was its first superintendent.

He gave his full co-operatives and active help when the reputed physician of Calcutta Dr. Radha Gobinda kar started the R.G. Kar medical school in the days of the Swadesi Movement. He served the institution as an honorary teacher for a pretty long time but severed his connection with it when it was taken over by the government.
When the famous Kabiraj Shyamadas Bachaspati set up "Baidyasastra Pathi", Sundarimohan extended his helping hand there also. While Kabiraj Bachaspati was the principal of the Ayurvedic section, Sundarimahan was the principal of the allopathic section of the institution. He advocated independent research in Ayurvedic on scientific lines.
His greatest contribution along this line was the establishment of the National Medical Institute. In the wake of the Non-Cooperation movement when the students of the Calcutta Medical College boycotted the Institution and came out, they raised the demand for an alternative non-government arrangement for their studies. It was Sundarimohan who came forward with the assurance that he would undertake this onerous task. So the National Medical Institute began to take shape in Calcutta. He was aided in this work by Dr. K. S. Roy and Dr. SR. C. Sengupta — two young and patriotic doctors of that time. Sundarimohan gave up his lucrative private practice, so that he might devote his whole time and energy to his new Institution. He acted as the Principal of this Institution without taking any remuneration, except conveyance expenses. This institute has now grown into Calcutta National Medical College — one of the foremost medical institutions of the country.

It was in the hospital of the National Medical Institute that Sundarimohan breathed his last on 4 April 1950. He had expressed his wish before his death that after his death, his body would be the property of his students and it would be utilised for teaching them dissection and anatomy. The hospital authorities, however, could not fulfil his last wish out of love and respect for this great and noble soul who had devoted long years of his life for the cause of Indian Freedom and in service of the people of the country.

Composition
It has already been noted that he had started composing also songs during Swadeshi Movement Period. He would also compose devotion songs which were of high standard. He altogether composed about 300 such songs. Not only that, he was also a very good singer of devotional songs and it was a part of his daily routine. He would get totally absorbed while singing Kirtans tears would flow down his eyes. Those present in his prayer gatherings could not but be moved, Rabindranath Tagore while coming and staying in Calcutta, would visit Sundari Mohan's place, at least twice or thrice a week for hearing his devotional songs (mostly "Kirtans").
It was already been mention that he was a regular writer mainly on public health affairs. His books "Saral Dharti Siksha & Susra Bidya" written in easy Bengali for junior nurse training and midwife training reared up a generation of Nurse and Midwife in Bengal, Assam, and Orissa, providing the helpless girls and widows from the middle class and backward poor families with opportunity of employment and honourable life social services.
His last great literary works was the writing of his Autobiography which, if published would have been a rare contribution in the political and social history of Eastern India covering an important and glorious period of about a century. But it is a matter of great regard that this valuable manuscript could not yet its way to a publisher's desk.

References

1857 births
1950 deaths
Indian independence activists from Bengal
20th-century Indian medical doctors
Presidency University, Kolkata alumni
19th-century Indian medical doctors
People from Balaganj Upazila
Medical doctors from Kolkata